Øyvind Eriksen (born 1 June 1964 in Larvik, Norway) is a Norwegian attorney and head of industry. On 1 January 2009, he took over from Leif-Arne Langøy as the CEO and president of Aker ASA.

Education and experience 
In addition to attending the Royal Norwegian Air Force's officer candidate school, Eriksen holds a law degree from the University of Oslo. He joined the Norwegian law firm BAHR in 1990, where he became a partner in 1996 and a director/chairman in 2003. As a corporate attorney, Eriksen dealt with strategic and operational transactions (M&A) and negotiations, among other things. Eriksen has held a number of directorships in various sectors, including shipping, finance, asset management/investment companies, offshore drilling, fisheries, media, trade and the manufacturing industry. As CEO, Eriksen is currently the chairman of the boards of Aker BP ASA, Cognite AS, Aker Capital AS, Aker Holding AS, Aker Horizons, Aker Property Group AS, C4IR Ocean, and REV Ocean AS. He is also a director of several companies, including Aker Solutions ASA, Aker BioMarine ASA, Aker Energy AS, Aker Carbon Capture AS, The Resource Group TRG AS, TRG Holding AS, The Norwegian Cancer Society (Kreftforeningen), and a member of World Economic Forum C4IR Global Network Advisory Board.

Aker Scholarship 
Eriksen is also the chairman of the board of Aker Scholarship, which finances Master's and PhD students at some of the world's leading universities. The goal is to inspire talented scholarship holders to play a part in developing Norwegian industry and society in the best way for future generations. The Aker Scholarship is awarded by the «Anne Grete Eidsvig and Kjell Inge Røkke's Charitable Foundation for Education».

The WE Foundation 
The WE Foundation (Norwegian: Stiftelsen VI) was established in 2018 with Eriksen as the chairman of its board. The WE Foundation works to improve the opportunities and rights of disabled people. Through this foundation, Aker, Aker-owned companies and Kjell Inge Røkke's privately owned company TRG have undertaken to contribute NOK 125 million to Paralympic sports during the 2018-2023 period.

References 

Living people
1964 births
People from Larvik
20th-century Norwegian lawyers
21st-century Norwegian lawyers
Norwegian chairpersons of corporations
Norwegian chief executives
University of Oslo alumni
Aker Group people